Denis Barantsev (born April 12, 1992) is a Russian professional ice hockey defenceman currently playing for Avtomobilist Yekaterinburg in the Kontinental Hockey League (KHL).

Barantsev made his KHL with HC Dynamo Moscow during the 2011–12 season.

References

External links

1992 births
Living people
Avtomobilist Yekaterinburg players
HC Dynamo Moscow players
HC Lada Togliatti players
Lokomotiv Yaroslavl players
Russian ice hockey defencemen
Sportspeople from Tolyatti
Torpedo Nizhny Novgorod players